The 1912 Indianapolis 500-Mile Race, or    International 500-Mile Sweepstakes Race, the second such race in history, was held at the Indianapolis Motor Speedway on Thursday, May 30, 1912. Indiana-born driver Joe Dawson won the race, leading only the final two laps. Ralph DePalma dominated the race, leading 196 of the 200 laps, and pulling out to an over 5-lap lead. But with just over two laps to go, his car failed with a broken connecting rod.

Summary
In the aftermath of victory by Ray Harroun in the single-seat Marmon "Wasp" in the first 500-Mile Race the year before, new rules made the presence of riding mechanics mandatory; maximum engine size remained 600 cubic inches (9.83 liters) displacement. At $50,000, the race purse was nearly double that of 1911.

Out of 29 original entries, 24 qualified for the race by sustaining a speed faster than a minimum of 75 mph (120.7 km/h) for a full lap, an increase from the quarter-mile qualifying distance of the inaugural year. David L. Bruce-Brown was fastest at 88.45 mph (142.35 km/h), but starting positions were again determined by entry date. Lining up five cars to the first four rows and four to a fifth, a change from the previous year's starting method was movement of the pace car, a Stutz, from the inside of the first row to out in front of the field.

Upon wave of the then-red starting flag, Teddy Tetzlaff took the lead in a Fiat from the third starting position in the center of the first row, and lead for the first two laps before being overtaken by the grey # 4 Mercedes of Italian-born Ralph DePalma.

DePalma's domination of most of the event was total, as he built an eventual five-and-a-half lap, eleven-minute advantage over second, and lead uncontested for the next 194 laps. On lap 87, DePalma led his 85th lap and became the all-time Indianapolis 500 lap leader with 89 laps led (he led 4 laps in the 1911 race), a title he would hold until lap 200 of the 1987 race, 75 years later. But at the beginning of lap 197, as his Mercedes began misfiring, and slowed on the main stretch at the conclusion of the lap. Nursed through the 198th lap by DePalma at reduced speed, the car finally lost all power at the end of the backstretch on lap 199, as a broken connecting rod tore a hole in the crankcase.

With the car's momentum carrying it around to the fourth turn, DePalma and riding mechanic Rupert Jeffkins then entered themselves into motor racing lore, as well as inspired the cheers of the more than 80,000 in attendance, as they climbed from the vehicle and begin pushing it down the five-eighths of a mile main stretch toward the start-finish line.

Indianapolis driver Joe Dawson and riding mechanic Harry Martin, running in the second position for most of the race in their blue and white National Motor Vehicle Company entry, finally passed DePalma midway down the main stretch to assume the lead for the concluding two laps, a record that would be held for the fewest led laps in history until 2011, following DePalma's 196 laps in the lead being the most ever in a race by a non-winner. Finishing more than ten minutes ahead of newly-second place Tetzlaff, Dawson completed another two laps for good measure upon fear of a scoring miscue. Sometime thereafter, DePalma and Jeffkins finally brought their car across the line, but in twofold futile endeavour: Speedway rules, requiring that all entries move under their own power, marked DePalma's final number of circuits at 198, and the push across the line, even if it counted, brought them only to the beginning of the final lap.

Dawson's run in the American-manufactured, four-cylinder National, with a winning time of 6:21:06 and averaging 78.719 mph (126.686 km/h), was twenty-one minutes two seconds faster than the previous 1911 record; The National team garnered $20,000 and additional contingency awards.

Ralph Mulford, being forced to stop numerous times due to clutch problems in his Knox, found irritation with the requirement and proceeded to drive on, long after all others were presented the chequered flag...and even after Speedway president Carl Fisher and starter Fred Wagner left the grounds (the latter after getting into an argument over whether to flag Mulford off before he had completed the distance, Wagner in favor and Fisher against).

Through numerous accounts of the run, including his reportedly changing shock absorbers for a gentler ride, as well as stopping for a dinner-on-the-go of fried chicken and ice-cream with his riding mechanic, Mulford's finish finally arrived, amid deserted grandstands and a setting sun over the main straightaway, 8 hours and 53 minutes after the start (approximately 6:53 p.m. local time), and with an average speed of 56.285 mph (90.582 km/h), which remains a record: the slowest finishing speed to date in 500 history.

Official results

Qualification results
 Entries required to complete one lap in excess of 75 mph (120.7 km/h) to qualify, but starting grid determined by order of entry date.
{| class="wikitable" style="font-size: 85%;"
|style="background:#F2F2F2;" align=center colspan="3"|Driver
|style="background:#F2F2F2;" align=center colspan="3" rowspan="3"|Far Inside
|style="background:#F2F2F2;" align=center colspan="3" rowspan="3"|Inside Center
|style="background:#F2F2F2;" align=center colspan="3" rowspan="3"|Center
|style="background:#F2F2F2;" align=center colspan="3" rowspan="3"|Outside Center
|style="background:#F2F2F2;" align=center colspan="3" rowspan="3"|Far Outside
|-
|style="background:#F2F2F2;" align=center rowspan="2"|Time
|style="background:#F2F2F2;" align=center colspan="2"|Speed
|-
|style="background:#F2F2F2;" align=center|(mph)
|style="background:#F2F2F2;" align=center|(km/h)
|-
|style="background:#F2F2F2;" align=center colspan=3 rowspan=2|Row 1
|colspan=3| Gil Andersen
|colspan=3| Len Zengel 
|colspan=3| Teddy Tetzlaff
|colspan=3|† Ralph DePalma
|colspan=3| Eddie Hearne
|-
|align=center|0:01:51.21
|align=center|80.93
|align=center|130.24
|align=center|0:01:54.14
|align=center|78.85
|align=center|126.90
|align=center|0:01:46.84
|align=center|84.24
|align=center|135.57
|align=center|0:01:44.63
|align=center|86.02
|align=center|138.44
|align=center|0:01:49.96
|align=center|81.85
|align=center|131.72
|-
|style="background:#F2F2F2;" align=center colspan=3 rowspan=2|Row 2
|colspan=3| Spencer Wishart
|colspan=3| Joe Dawson
|colspan=3| Howdy Wilcox
|colspan=3| Harry Knight
|colspan=3| Bert Dingley 
|-
|align=center|0:01:47.21
|align=center|83.95
|align=center|135.10
|align=center|0:01:44.49
|align=center|86.13
|align=center|138.61
|align=center|0:01:43.21
|align=center|87.20
|align=center|140.33
|align=center|0:01:58.55
|align=center|75.92
|align=center|122.18
|align=center|0:01:51.43
|align=center|80.77
|align=center|129.99
|-
|style="background:#F2F2F2;" align=center colspan=3 rowspan=2|Row 3
|colspan=3| Johnny Jenkins   
|colspan=3| Bob Burman  
|colspan=3| Eddie Rickenbacker Qualified by Lee Frayer
|colspan=3| Billy Liesaw  
|colspan=3| Bill Endicott 
|-
|align=center|0:01:51.36
|align=center|80.82
|align=center|130.07
|align=center|0:01:47.00
|align=center|84.11
|align=center|135.36
|align=center|0:01:56.43
|align=center|77.30
|align=center|124.40
|align=center|0:01:56.11
|align=center|77.51
|align=center|124.74
|align=center|0:01:51.70
|align=center|80.57
|align=center|129.66
|-
|style="background:#F2F2F2;" align=center colspan=3 rowspan=2|Row 4
|colspan=3| Ralph Mulford
|colspan=3| Hughie Hughes
|colspan=3| Joe Horan 
|colspan=3| Mel Marquette
|colspan=3| Len Ormsby 
|-
|align=center|0:01:42.41
|align=center|87.88
|align=center|141.43
|align=center|0:01:50.01
|align=center|81.81
|align=center|131.66
|align=center|0:01:51.83
|align=center|80.48
|align=center|129.52
|align=center|0:01:55.27
|align=center|78.08
|align=center|125.66
|align=center|0:01:47.03
|align=center|84.09
|align=center|135.33
|-
|style="background:#F2F2F2;" align=center colspan=3 rowspan=2|Row 5
|colspan=3| Joe Matson 
|colspan=3| Charlie Merz
|colspan=3| David L. Bruce-Brown
|colspan=3| Louis Disbrow
|colspan=3 rowspan=2| 
|-
|align=center|0:01:52.64
|align=center|79.90
|align=center|128.59
|align=center|0:01:54.10
|align=center|78.88
|align=center|126.95
|align=center|0:01:41.75
|align=center|88.45
|align=center|142.35
|align=center|0:01:57.59
|align=center|76.54
|align=center|123.18
|}

Race results
 Race finishing times recorded down to second intervals. All entries still running at conclusion scored ahead of non-finishing entries, regardless of race completion percentage. *Joe Dawson was relieved by Don Herr for laps 108-144. † De Palma is usually shown as American, but his application for a US passport (available at ) reveals that he did not become a US citizen until 1920Notes
Race field average engine displacement:
491.46 in3 / 8.05 L
Race field average qualifying speed:
81.762 mph / 131.583 km/h
Finishing entries average time and finishing speed:
6:57:25 (-8:02 from previous year and previous record)
72.457 mph / 116.609 km/h (+1.717 mph / +2.763 km/h, from previous year and previous record)

Race details
For 1912, riding mechanics were made mandatory.
Don Herr relieved Joe Dawson for several laps.

Works cited
 Popely, Rick and L. Spencer Riggs. Indianapolis 500 Chronicle. Lincolnwood, Illinois: Publications International, Ltd., 1999. 
 2006 Indianapolis 500 Official Program''

References

Indianapolis 500 races
Indianapolis 500
Indianapolis 500
Indianapolis 500
May 1912 sports events